2D Entertainment is an Indian film production and distribution company established by Suriya. Other key people involved are Rajsekar Pandian, Suriya wife Jyothika and Suriya brother Karthi. The company was named by the starting letter of Suriya children Diya and Dev. The company was established in 2013.

Filmography

Films produced

Films distributed
 Singam 2 (2013)
 Kadugu (2017)
 Sillu Karupatti (2019)
 Gargi (2022)

Film soundtracks produced
 Kadugu (2017)
 Magalir Mattum (2017)

Awards 
64th National Film Awards
 Best Cinematography at 64th National Film Awards for DOP Tirru for 24 (2016) 
 Best Production Design at 64th National Film Awards for Subrata Chakraborthy, Shreyas Khedekar, Amit Ray for 24 (2016) 
10th South Indian International Movie Awards
 Best Film-Tamil for Soorarai Pottru (2020)

68th National Film Awards
 Best Actor - Suriya for Soorarai Pottru
 Best Actress - Aparna Balamurali for Soorarai Pottru
 Best Feature Film - Suriya, Jyothika and Guneet Monga for Soorarai Pottru
 Best Music Direction (Background Score) - GV Prakash Kumar for Soorarai Pottru
Best Screenplay - Sudha Kongara for Soorarai Pottru

References

External links
 

Film production companies based in Chennai
Indian film studios